Tarlaağzı is a village in the Amasra District, Bartın Province, Turkey. Its population is 304 (2021).

History 
The village has had the same name since 1907.

Geography 
The village is 14 km from Bartın city center and 6 km from Amasra town centre. Kuşkayası Monument is located near the village.

References

Villages in Amasra District